Hinchinbrook Bay is a natural bay on the coast of Labrador in the province of Newfoundland and Labrador, Canada.

References

Bays of Newfoundland and Labrador

Hinchinbrook Bay, or Island as it is more famously known, is actually considered a tropical park and is called the Hinchinbrook Island National Park.